Knyaz Yurii Chodkiewicz (1515–1569) was a Ruthenian noble, Bielsk starost in 1556, Puńsk starost in 1568, Great Master of the Pantry of Lithuania in 1554, Grand Krajczy of Lithuania in 1555, and Trakai castellan in 1566.

He married Eugenia Hornostajowna before 1555 in Trakai. They had two children, Konstanty, born in Trakai in 1553, and Zofia, born in Zhytomir the following year. Eugenia died in 1557. 
In 1558, he married Princess Sophia Olelkovich-Slutska. She gave birth to Hieronim in 1560 in Vilnius, Halszka 1564 in Trakai, and Jerzy in 1570 in Žemaitkiemis.

Ancestry

See also
House of Chodkiewicz
Lithuanian nobility
Grand Duchy of Lithuania

1515 births
1569 deaths
People from Trakai
People from Trakai Voivodeship
Yurii Chodkiewicz
16th-century Polish nobility